Waña Quta (Aymara waña dry, quta lake, "dry lake", also spelled Huayña Khota) is a  mountain in the Bolivian Andes. It is located in the Potosí Department, Antonio Quijarro Province, Porco Municipality. It lies northeast of the village of Qhilla Qhilla (Kella Kella, Khella Khella).

References 

Mountains of Potosí Department